Harpreet Singh (Hindi: हरप्रीत सिंह, born April 27, 1979) is an Indian boxer.

Career
Harpreet has won a silver medal in Men's Boxing Heavyweight 91 kg category at 2006 Commonwealth Games.

References

1979 births
Living people
Place of birth missing (living people)
Indian male boxers
Commonwealth Games silver medallists for India
Commonwealth Games medallists in boxing
Boxers at the 2006 Asian Games
Boxers at the 2006 Commonwealth Games
Asian Games competitors for India
Heavyweight boxers
Medallists at the 2006 Commonwealth Games